Flemming Ammentorp Østergaard (born 31 October 1943 in Det Gule Palæ (Danish: The Yellow Palace), Ordrup) is a retired businessman, best known as long-time chairman of Parken Sport & Entertainment, who owns the football club F.C. Copenhagen. He is also known as Don Ø due to his sometimes Southern European paternal appearance, a nickname he received in the 1990s, by the editors of the  fanwebsite "Fusionsnipserne".

In the eighties he suffered leg injuries from a traffic accident. Although his doctor told him, that he would never walk again, he refused to give up, and managed to work and train his leg, so that he not only walked again, but also was able to win a club championship in his tennis club.

Although recognized as a first-class businessman and tough negotiator, Flemming Østergaard has primarily been in charge of the turn-around and rise of F.C. Copenhagen, to its present status as one of the leading football teams in Denmark.

Career
1968: Educated as a stockbroker.
1968: Sales manager in J.S. Lies Industries.
1971: Founds and runs own company, Føma Office Systems.
1975: Managing director in Tann Scandinavia.
1978: President of Tann Europe.
1988: Director in Kinnarps Office Furniture.
1994: Sells Kinnarps and take over Lyngby FC.
1996: Joins F.C. Copenhagen Ltd. (name later changed to Parken Sport & Entertainment A/S).
1997: Managing director in F.C. Copenhagen A/S.
2002: Stops as managing director in F.C. Copenhagen and takeover the post as chairman.
2007: Board member of TV 2 Denmark.
2010: Retired as chairman of Parken Sport & Entertainment.

Book publications
Don Ø, 2002
Varmt hjerte, koldt blod (Warm heart, cold blood), 2005
Manden bag myten (The man behind the myth), 2008

References

1943 births
Living people
20th-century Danish businesspeople
21st-century Danish businesspeople
F.C. Copenhagen non-playing staff
Danish football chairmen and investors
Stockbrokers
Businesspeople from Copenhagen
People from Gentofte Municipality
People from Rudersdal Municipality